This is a list of the buildings, sites, districts, and objects listed on the National Register of Historic Places in American Samoa. There are currently 31 listed sites spread across the three districts of American Samoa. There are no sites listed on the unorganized atoll of Swains Island.

Numbers of listings
The following are approximate tallies of current listings in American Samoa on the National Register of Historic Places. These counts are based on entries in the National Register Information Database as of April 24, 2008 and new weekly listings posted since then on the National Register of Historic Places web site. There are frequent additions to the listings and occasional delistings and the counts here are not official. Also, the counts in this table exclude boundary increase and decrease listings which modify the area covered by an existing property or district and which carry a separate National Register reference number.

Eastern

|}

Manu'a

|}

Rose Atoll

|}

Western

|}

See also
 List of United States National Historic Landmarks in United States commonwealths and territories, associated states, and foreign states
 List of National Natural Landmarks in American Samoa

References

External links

American Samoa Historic Preservation Office
National Park Service, National Register of Historic Places site

 
American Samoa-related lists